Carlia amax is a species of skink, commonly known as the bauxite rainbow-skink, in the genus Carlia. It is native to northern Australia.

References

Carlia
Reptiles described in 1974
Endemic fauna of Australia
Skinks of Australia
Taxa named by Glen Milton Storr